Birkholm may refer to:

 Places
 Birkholm, Danish island close to Ærø south of Funen
 Birkholm, one of the islets of the Sluseholmen Canal District, in Copenhagen, Denmark

 Buildings
 Birkholm, earlier name for Løvenborg, a manor house south of Holbæk, Denmark
 Birkholm Højskole, a folk high school located on Birkholm

 People
 Jens Birkholm (1869–1915), Danish painter
 René Birkholm (born 1957), Danish comics artist